Michael Jacob Michaelsen (April 11, 1899 – August 13, 1970) was a Danish boxer who competed in the 1928 Summer Olympics.  He was Jewish.

In 1928 he won the bronze medal in the heavyweight class after winning the third-place fight against Sverre Sørsdal.

He participated in the 1927 European Amateur Boxing Championships winning the third place and again in the 1930 European Amateur Boxing Championships where Michaelsen became European champion defeating Sweden's Bertil Molander in the final.

1928 Olympic results
Below is the record of Michael Michaelsen, a Danish heavyweight boxer who competed at the 1928 Amsterdam Olympics:

 Round of 16: bye
 Quarterfinal: defeated Georges Gardebois (France) on points
 Semifinal: lost to Arturo Rodriguez (Argentina) on points
 Bronze-Medal Bout: defeated Sverre Sørsdal (Norway) by walkover (was awarded bronze medal)

See also
 List of select Jewish boxers

References

External links
 

1899 births
1970 deaths
Jewish Danish sportspeople
Jewish boxers
Heavyweight boxers
Olympic boxers of Denmark
Boxers at the 1928 Summer Olympics
Olympic bronze medalists for Denmark
Olympic medalists in boxing
Danish male boxers
Medalists at the 1928 Summer Olympics